Linar Suleymanovich Salimullin (26 March 1932 – 20 December 1993) was a Soviet freestyle wrestler and sambist of Tatar descent. He competed in the men's freestyle featherweight at the 1956 Summer Olympics. After retirement from the competition he became a wrestling referee.

References

External links
 Салимуллин Линар Сулейманович | Спорт-страна.ру (in Russian)

1932 births
1993 deaths
Ukrainian sambo practitioners
Soviet male sport wrestlers
Olympic wrestlers of the Soviet Union
Wrestlers at the 1956 Summer Olympics